Cyperus subulatus, commonly known as the pointed flat-sedge, is a species of sedge that is endemic to eastern Australia.

The perennial sedge has a short rhizome with smooth culms, with a triangular cross-section, that are swollen toward the base.

The species was first formally described by the botanist Robert Brown in 1810.

It is mostly found in Queensland and New South Wales as well as Victoria. It grows well in coastal dune habitats and sometime in open sandy areas further inland and in open woodlands.

See also
 List of Cyperus species

References

subulatus
Taxa named by Robert Brown (botanist, born 1773)
Plants described in 1810
Flora of Queensland
Flora of New South Wales
Flora of Victoria (Australia)